The 1958 Delaware Fightin' Blue Hens football team was an American football team that represented the University of Delaware in the Middle Atlantic Conference (MAC) during the 1958 NCAA College Division football season. In its eighth season under head coach David M. Nelson, the team compiled a 5–3 record (2–3 against MAC opponents) and outscored opponents by a total of 188 to 102. Robert Jones was the team captain. The team played its home games at Delaware Stadium in Newark, Delaware.

Schedule

References

Delaware
Delaware Fightin' Blue Hens football seasons
Delaware Fightin' Blue Hens football